Martinez Playground is a public park in Bushwick, Brooklyn, New York City. It is located on Scholes Street between Manhattan and Graham Avenues.

Origins 
Martinez Playground honors Thelma Martinez (1918-1987), a life-long resident of New York City and a 30-year resident of the nearby Williamsburg Houses. Martinez' extensive work in the neighborhood included a special commitment to the park, formerly known as Williamsburg Playground.

On October 10, 1957 the City, in agreement with the New York City Housing Authority, leased the property to the New York City Department of Parks and Recreation to use for park and playground purposes.

Facilities 
 Basketball courts
 Bathrooms
 Handball courts
 Playgrounds
 Skateparks

"Blue Park" Skatepark
The Martinez Playground Skate Park, known as Blue Park Skate Park or Blue Park, was built in 2012–2013 and features manual pads of different shapes and sizes in a basketball court. The obstacles were built by California Skateparks.

Gallery

References

External links
 

Urban public parks
Parks in Brooklyn
Skateparks in New York City